Swan Lake is a lake in the Osoyoos Division Yale Land District within the Southern Interior of British Columbia, Canada.

Geographical context 
The lake is just east of the north end of Okanagan Lake, between Vernon and Armstrong.

References

Lakes of British Columbia
Lakes of the Okanagan
Osoyoos Division Yale Land District